The National Television Awards (often shortened to NTAs) is a British television awards ceremony, broadcast by the ITV network and initiated in 1995. The National Television Awards are the most prominent ceremony for which the results are voted on by the general public, and are often branded as 'television's biggest night of the year'.

History
The first National Television Awards (NTAs) ceremony was held in August 1995 and was hosted by Eamonn Holmes at Wembley Conference Centre. From 1996 onwards, it was traditionally held annually in October at the Royal Albert Hall and hosted by Sir Trevor McDonald. McDonald retired from the role after 12 years in 2008. In 2009, the NTAs changed the timing of the event from October to January so there was no event in that year. For the 2010 ceremony, Dermot O'Leary took over as host, and the ceremony was hosted at the O2 for the first time.

O'Leary decided to leave the programme on 13 February 2019. On 4 October 2019, in a video posted on social media, David Walliams was announced as the new NTAs host for 2020. Despite this, the ceremony remained at the O2 for the 10th successive year. The 26th ceremony was originally going to take place on 26th January but then due to the COVID-19 pandemic, it was postponed to 20 April, then postponed again to 9 September. In May 2021, it was announced that Joel Dommett would present the 26th ceremony, replacing Walliams. On 6 April 2022, it was confirmed that Dommett would return as host with the upcoming ceremony being held in September at a new venue, this being OVO Arena Wembley. The 2022 Awards were subsequently delayed to 13 October as a mark of respect following the death of Her Majesty Queen Elizabeth II.

The 2023 edition is scheduled to take place at the O2 Arena for the first time since 2021 on 5 September.

Ceremonies

References

External links
 

National Television Awards
ITV (TV network) original programming
British television awards
1995 British television series debuts
Award ceremonies
Awards established in 1995
Annual television shows